is a Japanese badminton player who plays for ACT Saikyo badminton club. She was the champion of the women's singles event at the 2016 Sydney International tournament and in 2017, she was chosen to join the B squad of Japan national badminton team.

Achievements

BWF World Tour (1 title, 1 runner-up) 
The BWF World Tour, which was announced on 19 March 2017 and implemented in 2018, is a series of elite badminton tournaments sanctioned by the Badminton World Federation (BWF). The BWF World Tour is divided into levels of World Tour Finals, Super 1000, Super 750, Super 500, Super 300 (part of the HSBC World Tour), and the BWF Tour Super 100.

Women's singles

BWF International Challenge/Series (5 titles) 
Women's singles

  BWF International Challenge tournament
  BWF International Series tournament
  BWF Future Series tournament

References

External links 
 

1998 births
Living people
Japanese female badminton players
Sportspeople from Saitama Prefecture
21st-century Japanese women